Marie Bernadine Hasler (born 1948) is a former New Zealand politician. She was a member of Parliament for the National Party from 1990 to 1993, and then again from 1996 to 2002.

Early life
Hasler was born in Dublin, Ireland. She came to New Zealand while young, and was educated at Auckland University. Before entering politics, she was employed in public relations, and also worked in the civil service.

Member of Parliament

Hasler was first elected to Parliament in the 1990 election as MP for Titirangi, but was defeated in the 1993 election by Labour's Suzanne Sinclair. In 1993, Hasler was awarded the New Zealand Suffrage Centennial Medal. In the 1996 election, she returned to Parliament as MP for Waitakere when she in turn beat Sinclair.

In the 2002 election, Hasler was only ranked thirty-second on National's party list, and as she did not manage to win back Waitakere, she left Parliament.

Political views

In 1998, as Minister of Cultural Affairs, Hasler called for a debate on whether the New Zealand flag should change. Hasler said at the time that for some years she believed New Zealand's existing flag no longer caught the essence of contemporary New Zealand. She also argued that the flag is indistinguishable from the Australian flag, and that it reflects New Zealand's former colonial status. The then-Prime Minister, Jenny Shipley, supported Hasler's view that a new flag for New Zealand could be the Silver fern flag.

Later years
Hasler unsuccessfully stood as a Citizens & Ratepayers candidate on the Waitākere Ward of the Auckland Council in the 2010 Local government elections.

Public relations manager

Hasler joined the  Employers and Manufacturers Association (EMA) after a 12-year political career as Member of Parliament for Waitakere, and Minister of the Crown.

She has been with EMA since 2004, first as a learning contractor, before joining the membership team for a couple of years, followed by her appointment as Public Relations Manager.

Her role includes generating public awareness of EMA's role and activities within the business and wider community and promoting EMA's extensive range of services to members; providing PR support to EMA business units; public speaking engagements; liaison with media, and facilitating opportunities for lawmakers to hear the concerns of EMA members through forums, seminars and business events.

References

External links
 New Zealand Executive – Profile of Marie Hasler

1948 births
Living people
New Zealand people of Irish descent
New Zealand National Party MPs
Women members of the New Zealand House of Representatives
New Zealand list MPs
Politicians from County Dublin
Unsuccessful candidates in the 1993 New Zealand general election
Unsuccessful candidates in the 2002 New Zealand general election
Members of the New Zealand House of Representatives
New Zealand MPs for Auckland electorates
21st-century New Zealand politicians
21st-century New Zealand women politicians
Recipients of the New Zealand Suffrage Centennial Medal 1993